James Agyekum Kotei (born 10 August 1993) is a Ghanaian footballer who plays as a defensive midfielder for Sohar in Oman.

Career

Early career
Born and raised in Accra, Ghana. Kotei began his footballing career with Kumasi-based Corner Babies F.C. in 2002 when he was 9 years old. In 2007, he moved to Golden Foot Academy where he played as an academy player for the renowned Accra-based football academy until 2009.

Ghana
Kotei began his professional footballing career in 2010 with Dansoman-based club, Liberty Professionals F.C.

Oman
He first left Ghana in 2015, joining Oman Professional League club Al-Oruba SC. He made his debut for the club on 8 September 2015 in a 1–1 draw against Muscat Club in the 2015–16 Oman Professional League Cup. He made his league debut on 13 September 2015 in a 3–1 win over newly promoted side, Salalah SC. He also made his debut in the Sultan Qaboos Cup on 30 December 2015 in a 2–1 win over fierce rivals, Sur SC. He finished with 8 appearances in the 2015–16 Oman Professional League.

Tanzania
In December 2016, he moved out to Tanzania where on 13 December he signed a one-year contract with Tanzanian giants, Simba S.C. He made his Tanzanian Premier League on 18 December 2016 in a 2–0 win over Ndanda F.C. He made his CAF Confederation Cup on 11 February 2018 against Nationale De Djibouti  He was adjudged the most valuable player in his side's 5–4 penalty win over rivals Young Africans S.C. in the Semi-finals of the Mapinduzi Cup of Tanzania on 10 January.

Kaizer Chiefs
In June 2019, Kotei signed for South African Premier Division side Kaizer Chiefs on a three-year contract. He was released by the club in January 2020, having failed to make an appearance for the club.

Slavia Mozyr
He signed for Belarusian club Slavia Mozyr in January 2020, before his contract was terminated in June 2020.

Style of play
Kotei plays as a defensive midfielder.

References

External links
 

1993 births
Living people
Footballers from Accra
Ghanaian footballers
Ghanaian expatriate footballers
Association football midfielders
Liberty Professionals F.C. players
Al-Orouba SC players
Expatriate footballers in Oman
Ghanaian expatriate sportspeople in Oman
Expatriate footballers in Tanzania
Ghanaian expatriate sportspeople in Tanzania
Expatriate soccer players in South Africa
Expatriate footballers in Belarus
Simba S.C. players
Kaizer Chiefs F.C. players
FC Slavia Mozyr players
BA Stars F.C. players
Tanzanian Premier League players
Sohar SC players